Amna Riaz (born 17 August 1990) is a Pakistani female YouTuber and food expert who is known for her channel Kitchen with Amna. She is the first Pakistani woman to receive a Gold Play Button.

Riaz started her channel in 2016 and subsequently uploaded her first video as a test. Riaz teaches beginners complex Pakistani dishes in short and simple videos.

Personal life
Riaz was born in Lahore, Pakistan.

Amna Riaz Butt has four siblings, two brothers and two sisters. She married Umair Zafar in 2020. She was blessed with a baby daughter in 2021. She named her Ayat Umair.

References

Living people
Pakistani YouTubers
People from Lahore
Pakistani people of Kashmiri descent
Food and cooking YouTubers
1980 births

External links